Shaqsha Punta (Quechua saqsa multi-colored, shaqsha  jingle bell; a typical dancer of the Ancash Region, punta peak; ridge; first, before, in front of, Hispanicized spelling Shacsha Punta) is a mountain in the Andes of Peru which reaches an altitude of approximately . It is located in the Lima Region, Huarochirí Province, Carampoma District, northwest of Wamanripayuq.

References

Mountains of Peru
Mountains of Lima Region